The Intermediate Sex (full title: The Intermediate Sex: A Study of Some Transitional Types of Men and Women) was a 1908 work by Edward Carpenter expressing his views on homosexuality. Carpenter argues that "uranism", as he terms homosexuality, was on the increase, marking a new age of sexual liberation. The work was an influence on Robert Graves and Siegfried Sassoon, both young war-poets and officers in England's trenches when they met. During the time they served together, the men were friends, and Pat Barker's novel Regeneration is a fictionalization of their interactions.

References

External links

1908 non-fiction books
LGBT non-fiction books
1900s LGBT literature

Referenced in the book "THINGS A BRIGHT GIRL CAN DO" By Sally Nicholls, 2017